Ånge IF is a Swedish football club located in Ånge.

Background 
Ånge IF currently plays in Division 5 which is the seventh tier of Swedish football. They play their home matches at the Ånge Idrottsplats in Ånge.

The club is affiliated to Medelpads Fotbollförbund.

Season to season  

* League restructuring in 2006 resulted in a new division being created at Tier 3 and subsequent divisions dropping a level.

Footnotes

External links 
 Ånge IF – Official website
 Ånge IF on Facebook

Sport in Västernorrland County
Football clubs in Västernorrland County
1980 establishments in Sweden